Steven Tilley  (born June 11, 1971) is a former Speaker of the Missouri House of Representatives. He represented District 106 (Perry, St. Francois and Ste. Genevieve Counties) in the Missouri House of Representatives. A Republican, Tilley was elected to the House in November 2004. He became the Majority leader in January 2008. On August 13, 2012 Tilley resigned from the Missouri House of Representatives.

Tilley was elected Speaker on November 4, 2010 after the Republicans picked up 17 seats in the 2010 election. On December 13, 2010, five weeks after being elected Speaker, Tilley altered his campaign committee in order to run for Lieutenant Governor of Missouri in 2012.

Background and education

Education
A 1989 graduate of Perryville High School in Perryville, Missouri, Tilley received a Bachelor of Science degree from Southeast Missouri State University in 1994 and received his Doctorate of Optometry from the University of Missouri-St. Louis School of Optometry in 1998.

Marriage and Family Life
Tilley lives in Perryville. He has two children: Kourtney and Korrin.  Tilley and his wife Kellie filed for divorce on September 14, 2011 after 18 years of marriage.  The divorce was cited as a reason for him dropping out of the lieutenant governor race as well as resigning in August 2012 as speaker of the Missouri House five months before his term expired.

Group Memberships
Tilley is a member of the Perryville Optimist Club, Missouri Right to Life, National Rifle Association, Missouri Optometric Association, American Optometric Association, N.F.I.B. and the Missouri Chamber of Commerce. He is also a CHAMPS mentor and attends Immanuel Lutheran Church of Perryville.

Political career
Tilley served in the Missouri House from 2005 to 2012. During that time, Tilley has served as the Chairman of the House Special Committee on General Laws, Chairman of the House Ethics Committee and as Majority Floor Leader.

Speaker of the Missouri House
Republicans in the Missouri House had their biggest majority in history (106-57).  Among his most visible events was erecting a statue of Rush Limbaugh in the capitol in the Hall of Famous Missourians.

As Speaker of the House, Tilley served as an ex-officio member of all committees of the House.  Additionally, he was specifically assigned to the House Ethics and Administration and Accounts.

Flooding Cairo controversy
In April 2011, Speaker Tilley received national media attention for controversial remarks he made about Cairo, Illinois, a poor town on the Illinois side of the Mississippi River. Due to heavy rainfall and high water levels on the river, the U.S. Army Corps of Engineers was considering a plan to destroy a levee on the Missouri side of the river in hopes of lowering the flood level and preventing severe flood damage to Cairo and other downstream areas. Destroying the levee would have flooded several hundred thousand acres of Missouri farmland. When reporters asked if he would rather see Missouri farmland flooded or the town of Cairo, Tilley responded "Cairo. I've been there. Trust me. Cairo." And further said "Have you been to Cairo? OK, then you known what I'm saying." Tilley later issued an apology:

I was asked a question about blowing up a dam in Missouri and the negative consequences that happened to Missouri. As the Speaker of the House, (I believe) my first responsibility is to Missourians. And in my effort to defend them, I went on to say some pretty insensitive and inappropriate remarks about Cairo

When later interviewed by a Missouri television station, Tilley said the accusations that he was a racist are ridiculous and that when one does as many interviews as he does, one is bound to say something stupid. The Corps of Engineers destroyed the levee on May 3, 2011, flooding 130,000 acres of Missouri farmland but saving the town of Cairo from flooding.

Electoral history

References

External links
Steven Tilley's Official House Site

1971 births
Living people
People from Perryville, Missouri
Southeast Missouri State University alumni
University of Missouri–St. Louis alumni
American optometrists
Speakers of the Missouri House of Representatives
Republican Party members of the Missouri House of Representatives
Politicians from Wiesbaden